Toufic Kreidieh is a businessman who is the founding partner and CEO of the Brands for Less (BFL) Group, an international discount retailer founded in 1996.

Toufic Kreidieh founded BFL in 1996, with their first store in Lebanon. BFL established its first store and corporate headquarters in the United Arab Emirates in 2000. and its first Tchibo store was launched in 2006.

Biography

Toufic is a survivor of the Civil War in Lebanon. He completed a degree in Bachelor of Science (B.Sc.) in Business Management at the Lebanese American University, Lebanon.

Toufic Kreidieh founded the BFL group in 1996 along with his partner Yasser Beydoun. He was instrumental in expanding the BFL Group's portfolio beyond the original Brands for Less, by the acquisition and development of additional businesses such as Toys For Less, Homes For Less, and Tchibo, as well as acquiring franchise rights for Mumuso. Currently BFL Group has dozens of stores in major cities across Europe and the Middle East.

BFL Group

The BFL Group was founded by Toufic Kreidieh and Yasser Beydoun in 1996. It is headquartered in Dubai. as well as in neighboring countries such as Oman.

BFL, which stands for "Brands for Less," has more than 74 stores spread over 6 countries in the Middle East and Europe (including Spain and Malta). It has expanded with brands such as Homes For Less, Toys For Less, Muy Mucho, and Tchibo.

References 

Living people
Emirati business executives
Lebanese businesspeople
Businesspeople from Dubai
Year of birth missing (living people)